The Gereja Kristen Kalam Kudus was a mission of the Evangelize China Fellowship in Indonesia. The founder evangelist was Ji Zhiwen. It has 28 congregations and more than 5,000 members.

References 

Christian missions in China